Jess Johnson (born 1979) is a New York-based New Zealand contemporary artist who works in drawing, installation, animation, and virtual reality. Her drawings depict alternative realms while her collaborations with Simon Ward and Andrew Clarke adapt the world of her drawings into video animations and virtual reality.

Early life and education
Jess Johnson was born in Tauranga, New Zealand in 1979. She grew up in Mount Maunganui, New Zealand and attended University of Canterbury in Christchurch from 1997 to 2001, where she earned a BFA.

Career
In 2004 she moved to Melbourne, Australia, where she co-founded and ran Hell Gallery from 2008 to 2011. She began exhibiting her work in group and solo shows throughout Australia and New Zealand, including shows at institutions such as the Museum of Contemporary Art in Sydney and the National Gallery of Victoria in Melbourne.

In 2016 she relocated permanently to New York City after participating in the Australia Council's Greene Street residency in SoHo.

Works

Drawings 

Johnson's drawings typically include bold colours, repetitive and fractal geometric shapes, humanoid figures, alien creatures, and structures that draw from both classical and ancient architecture. They have been likened to the work of Japanese pop-psychedelia artist Keiichi Tanaami. Although the detail and precision of her drawings suggest digital composition, the drawings are all done by hand. Mistakes made during the creation of her drawings "act as mutational directions" that she incorporates into them. She has said: "If I were able to digitally erase my mistakes, I wouldn't necessarily get that organic growth in the world. I like that it's a little out of my control and driven by something else."

About Johnson's drawings, Chloe Mandryk of Art Almanac wrote:
Jess Johnson's complex and sensuous images use bold colour and a geometric bravura that conjure the glow and kinaesthesia of arcade video games and the 'wormholes' of speculative thought so key to good science fiction. Her humanoids occupy a virtual reality  patterns and ancient architectural forms that delineate the boundaries of these imagined spaces.

Johnson has discussed the role of text in the creation of her drawings:
Whenever I start a new drawing I first choose a piece of text from one of my notebooks. The text is almost always the starting point. Whatever amorphous vibe the words give off determines the imagery that comes. The phrases are often rhythmic and I choose them because they get stuck in my head like thought-worms. The text plays a really practical role in the construction of the drawings. The letters and words are like scaffolding and I often arrange the composition around them. The number of letters gives me mathematical starting points for mapping out other areas.

Animation and virtual reality 

In 2014, Johnson began collaborating with video artist Simon Ward to adapt her drawings into animated video. Their first collaborative work, the single-channel high-definition digital video Mnemonic Pulse, premiered at Gertrude Contemporary in Melbourne in March 2014. Composer Andrew Clarke created original audio for the piece and continues to collaborate with Johnson and Ward.

The first virtual reality work created by Johnson, Ward, and Clarke, Ixian Gate, premiered in 2015 as the centerpiece of Johnson's solo exhibition, WURM HAUS, at the National Gallery of Victoria in Melbourne.

Johnson and Ward then began creating a series of five HD video animations, each of which translated a single drawing by Johnson. In 2017, these videos premiered at The National 2017 at Carriageworks in Sydney as the installation piece WHOL WHY WURLD. The work was a finalist for the 2018 Walters Prize.

In May 2017, Johnson and Ward received a commission from the National Gallery of Australia (Canberra) for a major new virtual reality work as part of the Balnaves Contemporary Intervention Series. Five new VR pieces premiered as part of Terminus, Johnson and Ward's exhibition at the NGA, opening 4 May 2018.

Influences 

Johnson has identified a wide range of influences including the ideas of Terence McKenna; Frank Herbert's Dune and the works of Alejandro Jodorowsky; the dystopian novel Riddley Walker by Russell Hoban; early video games; and comics.

Exhibitions

Selected solo exhibitions 
Core Dump, Jack Hanley Gallery, New York, NY, 2022
Neon Meat Dream, Nanzuka Gallery, Tokyo, Japan, 2019
Panspermia, Sing Omega, Jack Hanley Gallery, New York, NY, 2019
 Terminus (w/ Simon Ward), National Gallery of Australia, Canberra, 2018
 Auckland Art Fair, Ivan Anthony Gallery, Auckland, New Zealand, 2018
 Everything not saved will be lost, Jack Hanley Gallery, New York, NY, 2017
 Jess Johnson at CLIFT, presented by FOUR A.M, San Francisco, CA, 2017
 Hex Nemesis, Fremantle Arts Centre, Fremantle, Australia, 2017
 Chondrule Terminus (w/ Andrew Clarke), Dark Mofo: Welcome Stranger, Tasmania, Australia, 2017
 Darren Knight Gallery, Discoveries Section, Art Basel, Hong Kong, 2016
 Eclectrc Panoptic, Talbot Rice Gallery, Edinburgh, Scotland, 2017
 Wurm Haus, National Gallery of Victoria, Melbourne, Australia, 2015
 Sensorium Chamber, Ivan Anthony Gallery, Auckland, New Zealand, 2015
 Endless Future Terror Forever, Darren Knight Gallery, Sydney, Australia, 2015
 Gertrude Edition 2015, Gertrude Contemporary Art Spaces, Melbourne, Australia, 2015
 Electric Affinity: Jess Johnson/Tina Havelock Stevens, Alaska Projects, Sydney, Australia, 2015
 Ratholes in the Babylon of Information, Ivan Anthony Gallery, Auckland, New Zealand, 2014
 Gamma World, Vivid Festival, MCA Facade, Sydney, Australia, 2014
 Mnemonic Pulse, Gertrude Contemporary Studio 12, Melbourne, Australia, 2014

Awards 
 John McCaughey Memorial Prize, acquisitive commission for National Gallery of Victoria, Australia, 2013

Collections 

Jess Johnson's works are held in the following permanent collections:
 Christchurch Art Gallery, New Zealand (3 works)
 James Wallace Arts Trust, Auckland, New Zealand (2 works)
 National Gallery of Australia, Canberra, Australia
 Museum of Contemporary Art, NSW Australia (1 work)
 Monash University Museum of Art, VIC Australia (3 works)
 Michael Buxton Collection] Melbourne, Australia (3 works)
 National Gallery of Victoria, Melbourne, Australia (14 works)
 Artbank, NSW Australia (2 works)

References

Further reading 
 "Caught In Eternal Digital Glitches: A Conversation With Jess Johnson", Filthy Dreams, October 2017
 "Artist Profile: Jess Johnson and the New Language of Virtual Reality," Huffington Post, July 2016
 "The gorgeous, unsettling worlds of Jess Johnson," Versions, April 2016

1979 births
Living people
21st-century New Zealand women artists
New Zealand animators
New Zealand animated film directors
New Zealand women animators
New Zealand film directors
New Zealand women film directors
New Zealand emigrants to the United States
People from Tauranga
People from Mount Maunganui
University of Canterbury alumni
Artists from New York City